South City Hospital is a private hospital located in Karachi, Sindh, Pakistan. Founded in 2004, the hospital has emerged as a popular medical treatment center in the city.

Size
The hospital is built on a space of more than 3,000 square yards accommodating over 200 in-patient at a time. South City has a team of more than 100 consultants, and also includes a genetics and IVF centre.

Facilities
South City Hospital follows the model of combining luxury with medical treatment, and charges higher prices that other similar hospitals in Karachi. The hospital includes a CCU, ICU, Operating Theatre, Cardiac Unit, Radiology Unit, Laboratory and multiple Pharmacies.

COVID-19
South City was designated by the Government of Pakistan as one of the first COVID-19 medical centers. It is currently offering COVID-19 vaccinations.

References

Health care companies of Pakistan
Hospital networks in Pakistan
Hospitals in Karachi
Companies based in Karachi